The western worm lizard (Amphisbaena occidentalis) is a worm lizard species in the family Amphisbaenidae. It is endemic to Peru.

References

Amphisbaena (lizard)
Reptiles described in 1876
Taxa named by Edward Drinker Cope
Endemic fauna of Peru
Reptiles of Peru